The Order of the Northwest Territories is a civil honour for merit in the Canadian territory of the Northwest Territories. Instituted in 2013, it is the highest honour which can be bestowed by the Government of the Northwest Territories.  It is intended to honour current and former residents of the territory who have served with the great distinction and excelling in any field of endeavour for the benefit the people of the Northwest Territories and others. The commissioner of the Northwest Territories is a member of the order by virtue of their position, and serves as the chancellor of the order.

Recipients
First awarded in 2015, in the first two years it may be awarded to up to 10 people. In subsequent years it may be awarded to no more than three persons annually.

Chancellors/Commissioners
 George Tuccaro (2015)
 Margaret Thom (2017)

2015
Bruce Green
Lucy Jackson
Sonny MacDonald
Gino Pin
Ruth Spence
John B. Zoè

2016
Nellie Cournoyea
Jan Stirling
Tony Whitford
Marie Wilson

2017
 Paul Andrew
 Fred Carmichael
 Russell King
 Linda Koe
 Jeff Philipp
 Tom Zubko

2018
 Les Carpenter
 Sharon Firth
 Lillian Elias

2019
 Lyda Fuller
 "Buffalo" Joe McBryan

2022
 JoAnne Deneron
 Paul Kaeser II
 Mary Effie Snowshoe

References

External links
Official website

Provincial and territorial orders of Canada
Culture of the Northwest Territories